The Olkaria II Geothermal Power Station also known as Olkaria II Geothermal Power Plant is  a geothermal power plant in Kenya, with installed electric generating capacity of

Location
The coordinates of Olkaria are:0°51'49.0"S, 36°18'00.0"E (Latitude:-0.8636; Longitude:36.3000).

History
Olkaria II went on-stream in 2003 when Kenya Electricity Generating Company (KenGen) commissioned two 35 MW units manufactured and installed by Mitsubishi Heavy Industries (MHI). In 2010, a third unit of 35 MW capacity was installed, at a cost of approximately US$100 million, bringing the total capacity to 105 Megawatts. The expansion was financed by (a) the European Investment Bank, which lent US$40.8 million (KSh303 billion), the International Development Association, which lent US$27.6 million (KSh2.2 billion), the French Development Agency, which lent US$20 million (KSh1.6 billion) and KenGen, which contributed the balance. The Olkaria II  power plant is one of six geothermal stations either planned or already operational in the Olkaria area in Nakuru County.

Ownership
Olkaria II Power Station is owned by KenGen, a public company, whose stock is traded on the Nairobi Stock Exchange, and in which the government of Kenya maintains 70 percent shareholding, the remaining 30 percent being held by private individual and institutional investors.

See also

List of power stations in Kenya
Geothermal power in Kenya
Olkaria I Geothermal Power Station
Olkaria III Geothermal Power Station
Olkaria IV Geothermal Power Station
Olkaria V Geothermal Power Station

References

External links
Website of Kenya Electricity Generating Company

2010 establishments in Kenya
Energy infrastructure completed in 2010
Geothermal power stations in Kenya